Flamingo Road may refer to: 
 Flamingo Road (novel), a 1942 novel by Robert Wilder
 Flamingo Road (film), a 1949 film by Michael Curtiz starring Joan Crawford, from the novel by Robert Wilder
 Flamingo Road (TV series), (1980–1982) from the novel by Robert Wilder
 Florida State Road 823, in part Flamingo Road, a major north–south road in Broward County, Florida
 Flamingo Road (Las Vegas), a road